Anabel Moro (born 27 June 1979) is an Argentine Paralympic swimmer who competes in international level events. She is a multiple Parapan American medalist and has participated at the Summer Paralympics four times.

Moro began swimming when she was 9 years old.  She began losing her sight due to Maculopathy when she was 14 years old.

References

1979 births
Living people
Sportspeople from Rosario, Santa Fe
Paralympic swimmers of Argentina
Argentine female freestyle swimmers
Argentine female breaststroke swimmers
Swimmers at the 2004 Summer Paralympics
Swimmers at the 2008 Summer Paralympics
Swimmers at the 2012 Summer Paralympics
Swimmers at the 2016 Summer Paralympics
Medalists at the World Para Swimming Championships
Medalists at the 2003 Parapan American Games
Medalists at the 2011 Parapan American Games
Medalists at the 2015 Parapan American Games
Medalists at the 2019 Parapan American Games
Paralympic swimmers with a vision impairment
S12-classified Paralympic swimmers
21st-century Argentine women
Argentine blind people